Eddystone Arsenal was a Baldwin Locomotive Works subsidiary located in Eddystone, Pennsylvania that produced military hardware for the Allies of World War I. As orders from combatants exceeded the production capacity of Baldwin's Philadelphia factory, new manufacturing facilities were built in Eddystone, Pennsylvania. When the first world war ended, this manufacturing complex was used for locomotive manufacturing as Baldwin's Eddystone Plant.

Wartime locomotive orders
Baldwin received locomotive orders from Imperial Russia, France, and the United Kingdom of Great Britain and Ireland as those nations' manufacturing facilities were refocused on armaments production. Baldwin's vice president Samuel M. Vauclain visited Russia in 1914 to obtain orders for thirty 0-6-6-0 Mallet locomotives for the 3 ft 6 in gauge railways between Arkhangelsk and Vologda. This was followed by orders for 2-10-0 Russian gauge locomotives and 75 cm gauge gasoline locomotives for Russian trench railways. France ordered more than one-thousand trench railway locomotives, and the United Kingdom ordered 495 trench railway locomotives and 465 locomotives for standard-gauge railways.

Eddystone Ammunition Corporation

Although Baldwin's Philadelphia plant was enlarged to include a 4-story extension to the truck shop and a new 8-story building, completion of ammunition orders required construction of new manufacturing facilities at Eddystone, where Baldwin had been operating a shop since 1905. Baldwin formed the Eddystone Ammunition Corporation on 10 June 1915 to manufacture 2,500,000  shrapnel shells of Russian design. The Eddystone Ammunition plant adjacent to the Delaware River was operational by November 1915 including a modern wharf along the river front. This plant was the source of the Eddystone explosion which killed 133 people on 10 April 1917. Another Baldwin subsidiary, the Eddystone Munitions Company, was organized on 27 September 1917 to manufacture shrapnel for the United States government. Total production was 6,565,355 artillery shells before the plant was converted to locomotive shops in 1919.

Eddystone Rifle Plant

On 30 April 1915 the United Kingdom placed a contract with Remington Arms for 1,500,000 Pattern 1914 Enfield rifles. The rifle plant employed 15,294 workers, with women accounting for 20 percent of the peak work force, manufacturing up to 6,000 rifles per day. Rifle plant operations ceased on 11 January 1919 after producing 1,959,954 rifles with spare parts equivalent to 200,000 more rifles. Contract changes resulted in most rifles being completed to the modified M1917 Enfield design, which was carried by nearly two-thirds of the American Expeditionary Forces.

Sources

1915 establishments in Pennsylvania
Ammunition manufacturers
 
Companies based in Delaware County, Pennsylvania
Firearm manufacturers of the United States
Defunct manufacturing companies based in Pennsylvania